Draca may refer to:

 Germanic dragon
 Drača, a village in Serbia